Washington Catholic High School is a private, Roman Catholic high school located adjacent to the courthouse square in Washington, Indiana.  It is a part of the Roman Catholic Diocese of Evansville.  It is part of a larger school system that was founded by Mother Theodore Guerin in 1857.  Until recently, it was under the care of the Sisters of Providence of Saint Mary-of-the-Woods. The school's clubs and extracurriculars consist of M.S./H.S. Choir (Participating in the yearly regional ISSMA vocal contest), Key Club, Beta Club, Art Club, M.S./H.S. Band (Participating in the yearly regional ISSMA instrumental contest), "Spotlight" (School Newspaper), Yearbook

The school's athletic nickname is the "Cardinals", and it participates in the Blue Chip Conference.

Notes and references

External links
 

High schools in Southwestern Indiana
Roman Catholic Diocese of Evansville
Washington, Indiana
Catholic secondary schools in Indiana
Private high schools in Indiana
Blue Chip Conference
Schools in Daviess County, Indiana
Educational institutions established in 1914
1914 establishments in Indiana